Schwerer Gustav (English: Heavy Gustav) was a German  railway gun. It was developed in the late 1930s by Krupp in Rügenwalde as siege artillery for the explicit purpose of destroying the main forts of the French Maginot Line, the strongest fortifications in existence at the time.

The gun was designed in preparation for the Battle of France, but was not ready for action when that battle began, and in any case the Wehrmacht's Blitzkrieg offensive through Belgium rapidly outflanked and isolated the Maginot Line's static defences, which were then besieged with more conventional heavy guns until French capitulation. The gun was moved to Leningrad, and may have been intended to be used in the Warsaw Uprising like other German heavy siege pieces, but the uprising was crushed before it could be prepared to fire. Gustav was destroyed by the Germans near the end of the war in 1945 to avoid capture by the Soviet Red Army.

Schwerer Gustav was the largest-calibre rifled weapon ever used in combat, and in terms of overall weight, the heaviest mobile artillery piece ever built. It fired the heaviest shells of any artillery piece. It was surpassed in calibre only by the unused British Mallet's Mortar and the American Little David bomb-testing mortar—both at —but was the only one of the three to be used in combat.

Development

In 1934, the German Army High Command (Oberkommando des Heeres (OKH)) commissioned Krupp of Essen to design a gun to destroy the forts of the French Maginot Line that were nearing completion. The gun's shells had to punch through seven metres of reinforced concrete or one full metre of steel armour plate, from beyond the range of French artillery. The size and weight meant that to be at all movable it would need to be supported on twin sets of railway tracks. In common with smaller railway guns, the only barrel movement on the mount itself would be elevation, traverse being managed by moving the weapon along a curved section of railway line. Krupp prepared plans for calibres of 70 cm, 80 cm, 85 cm, and 1 m.

Nothing further happened until March 1936 when, during a visit to Essen, Adolf Hitler inquired as to the giant guns' feasibility. No definite commitment was given by Hitler, but design work began on an 80 cm model. The resulting plans were completed in early 1937 and approved. Fabrication of the first gun started in mid-1937. Technical complications in the forging of such massive pieces of steel made it apparent that the original completion date of early 1940 could not be met.

Krupp built a test model in late 1939 and sent it to the Hillersleben proving ground for testing. Penetration was tested on this occasion. Firing at high elevation, the  shell was able to penetrate the specified seven metres of concrete and the one metre armour plate. When the tests were completed in mid-1940 the complex carriage was further developed. Alfried Krupp, after whose father the gun was named, personally hosted Hitler at the Rügenwalde Proving Ground during the formal acceptance trials of the Gustav Gun in early 1941.

Two guns were ordered. The first round was test-fired from the commissioned gun barrel on 10 September 1941 from a makeshift gun carriage at Hillersleben.

In combat, the gun was mounted on a specially designed chassis, supported by eight bogies on two parallel railway tracks. Each of the bogies had five axles, giving a total of 40 axles (80 wheels). Krupp named the gun Schwerer Gustav (Heavy Gustav) after the senior director of the firm, Gustav Krupp von Bohlen und Halbach.

The gun could fire a heavy concrete-piercing shell and a lighter high-explosive shell.

In keeping with the tradition of the Krupp company, no payment was asked for the first gun. They charged seven million Reichsmark (approximately 24 million USD in 2015) for the second gun, Dora, named after the senior engineer's wife.

History

Schwerer Gustav
In February 1942, Heavy Artillery Unit (E) 672 reorganised and went on the march, and Schwerer Gustav began its long ride to  Crimea. The train carrying the gun was of 25 cars, a total length of 1.5 kilometres (0.9 mi). The gun reached the Perekop Isthmus in early March 1942, where it was held until early April. At the end of the spur, they built four semi-circular tracks especially for the Gustav to traverse. Outer tracks were required for the cranes that assembled Gustav.

The siege of Sevastopol was the gun's first combat test. 4,000 men and five weeks were needed to get the gun into firing position; 500 men were needed to fire it. Installation began in early May, and by 5 June the gun was ready to fire.  The following targets were engaged:
 5 June
 Coastal guns at a range of 25,000 m. Eight shells fired.
 Fort Stalin. Six shells fired.
 6 June
 Fort Molotov. Seven shells fired.
 "White Cliff" also known as "Ammunition Mountain": an undersea ammunition magazine in Severnaya ("Northern") Bay. The magazine was sited 30 metres under the sea with at least 10 metres of concrete protection. After nine shells were fired, the magazine was ruined and one of the boats in the bay sunk.
 7 June
 Firing in support of an infantry attack on Südwestspitze, an outlying fortification. Seven shells fired.
 11 June
 Fort Siberia knocked out of action. Five shells fired.
 17 June
 Maxim Gorky Fortresses bombarded. Five shells fired.

By the end of the siege on 4 July the city of Sevastopol lay in ruins, and 30,000 tons of artillery ammunition had been fired. Gustav had fired 47 rounds and worn out its original barrel, which had already fired around 250 rounds during testing and development. The gun was fitted with the spare barrel and the original was sent back to Krupp's factory in Essen for relining.

The gun was then dismantled and moved to the northern part of the eastern front, where an attack was planned on Leningrad. The gun was placed 30 km (18.6 mi) from the city near the railway station of Taytsy. The gun was fully operational when the attack was cancelled. The gun then spent the winter of 1942/43 near Leningrad.

Dora

Dora was the second gun produced. It was deployed briefly against Stalingrad, where the gun arrived at its emplacement  to the west of the city sometime in mid-August 1942. It was ready to fire on 13 September. It was withdrawn when Soviet forces threatened to encircle the German forces. When the Germans began their long retreat, they took Dora with them.

Langer Gustav
The Langer Gustav was a long cannon with 52 centimetre (20.5 in) calibre and a 43-metre barrel. It was intended to fire super-long-range rocket projectiles weighing 680 kilograms to a range of 190 kilometres (118 mi). This gave it the range to hit London from Calais, France. It was never completed after being damaged during construction by one of the many RAF bombing raids on Essen.

Landkreuzer P. 1500 Monster Project

The Monster was to be a 1,500 tonne mobile, self-propelled platform for an 80-cm K (E) gun, along with two 15 cm sFH 18 heavy howitzers, and multiple MG 151 autocannons normally used on combat aircraft. It was deemed impractical, and in 1943 was canceled by Albert Speer. It never left the drawing board and no progress was made. It would have surpassed the Panzer VIII Maus (the heaviest tank ever built) and the Landkreuzer P. 1000 Ratte (never built) in weight and size.

Postwar whereabouts

On 14 April 1945, one day before the arrival of US troops, Schwerer Gustav was destroyed to prevent its capture. In summer 1945 Schwerer Gustav was studied by Soviet specialists and in autumn of the same year was transferred to Merseburg, where the Soviets were gathering German military material. 

In March 1945, Dora was transferred to Grafenwöhr and was blown up there on 19 April 1945.  The debris was discovered by American troops sometime after the discovery of Schwerer Gustav's ruins. The debris was scrapped in the 1950s.

Part of the third (52 centimetre) gun was found after the war in the Krupp production facilities in Essen.

The world's largest "Dora ensemble" is located in the Military History Museum of the Bundeswehr in Dresden.

Ammunition

Models
 80 cm "Schwerer Gustav" (Heavy Gustav) - Deployed in March 1942 against Sevastopol.
 80 cm "Dora" - Deployed against Stalingrad in September 1942. Possibly never fired.
 52 cm "Langer Gustav" (Long Gustav) - Started but not finished.

See also
 Large-calibre artillery
 List of the largest cannon by caliber
 Sturmtiger
 Karl-Gerät
 Leopold railway gun
 M65 atomic cannon
 V-3 cannon
 Paris Gun
 Project Babylon

References

Notes

Bibliography 
 German Artillery of World War Two, Ian V. Hogg.

Further reading

External links

 Internet archive of transportation and firing images
 Internet archive copy of panzerlexikon.de video of Dora loading and firing
 Internet archive copy of panzerlexikon.de video of Dora
 Internet archive copy of website with additional information
 Image of Hitler looking at the Gustav Railway gun

World War II artillery of Germany
800 mm artillery
Siege artillery
Individual cannons
Railway guns
Weapons and ammunition introduced in 1941